Tpr-Met fusion protein is an oncogene fusion protein consisting of TPR and MET.

Structure 
Tpr-Met was generated following a chromosomal rearrangement induced by the treatment of a human osteogenic sarcoma cell line with the carcinogen N-methyl-N'-nitronitrosoguanidine. The genomic rearrangement fuses two genetic loci, translocated promoter region, from chromosome 1q25 which encodes a dimerization leucine zipper motif, and MET, from chromosome 7q31 which contributes the kinase domain and carboxy-terminus of the Met RTK. The resulting 65 kDa cytoplasmic Tpr-Met oncoprotein forms a dimer mediated through the Tpr leucine zipper.

The Tpr-Met fusion protein lacks the extracellular, transmembrane and juxtamembrane domains of c-Met receptor, and has gained the Tpr dimerization motif, which allows constitutive and ligand-independent activation of the kinase. The loss of juxtamembrane sequences, necessary for the negative regulation of kinase activity and receptor degradation, prolongs duration of Met signalling.

Experimental evidences

Effects in muscle

Skeletal muscle 
Specific expression of Tpr-Met in terminally-differentiated skeletal muscle causes muscle wasting in vivo and exerts anti-differentiation effects in terminally differentiated myotubes. Constitutive activation of MET signaling has been suggested to cause defects in myogenic differentiation, contributing to rhabdomyosarcoma development and progression.

Cardiac muscle 
In a transgenic model, cardiac-specific expression of Tpr-Met oncogene during postnatal life causes heart failure with early-onset.

References

External links
 

Engineered proteins